Hebsur  is a village in the southern state of Karnataka, India. It is located in the Hubli taluk of Dharwad district in Karnataka.

Demographics
As of the 2011 Census of India there were 1,276 households in Hebsur and a total population of 6,245 consisting of 3,152 males and 3,093 females. There were 700 children ages 0-6.

See also
 Dharwad
 Districts of Karnataka

References

External links
 http://Dharwad.nic.in/

Villages in Dharwad district